Sigoulès is a former commune in the Dordogne department in Nouvelle-Aquitaine in southwestern France. On 1 January 2019, it was merged into the new commune Sigoulès-et-Flaugeac.

Population

See also
Communes of the Dordogne département

References

Former communes of Dordogne